The list of shipwrecks in April 1886 includes ships sunk, foundered, grounded, or otherwise lost during April 1886.

3 April

5 April

6 April
For the sinking of Oconto on this date, see the entry for 5 December 1885.

7 April

8 April

9 April

11 April

12 April

13 April

14 April

15 April

16 April

17 April

18 April

19 April

20 April

21 April

23 April

24 April

28 April

30 April

Unknown date

References

1886-04
Maritime incidents in April 1886